Spotscale barb (Enteromius holotaenia) is a species of ray-finned fish in the genus Enteromius which occurs in western central Africa from Cameroon south to Angola.

Footnotes 

 

Enteromius
Cyprinid fish of Africa
Taxa named by George Albert Boulenger
Fish described in 1904